Melincourt Falls is an  high waterfall on Melin Court Brook, a left-bank tributary of the River Neath / Afon Nedd, located  south of Resolven in the county borough of Neath Port Talbot, south Wales. It is formed where the brook plunges over a resistant band of 'Lower Pennant Sandstone' in a 13 acre / 5 hectare nature reserve managed by the Wildlife Trust of South and West Wales. 
The falls have been drawing visitors for at least two centuries – they are certainly known to have inspired J. M. W. Turner to paint them in 1794.  The falls are considered by some to constitute a part of Waterfall Country though the bulk of these falls are a few miles further northeast at the head of the Vale of Neath.

Visitor facilities

The entrance to the path is on the opposite side of the road from the public car park. The falls (otherwise known as Melincwrt Falls), can also be viewed from above where a minor public road bridges the brook immediately upstream of the drop.

Gallery

External links
 Melincourt Waterfalls
 South and West Wales Wildlife Trust website
 images of Melin Court Falls and the surrounding area on the Geograph website
 Open source map showing location of falls and nearest carpark (approx 1 mile away)

References

Waterfalls of Neath Port Talbot
Vale of Neath